Duplain may refer to:
 Claude Duplain (born 1954), Canadian politician
 Duplain Township, Michigan, United States
 Duplainville, Wisconsin, a neighborhood, United States